Ngwe Kyi (born 26 March 1948) is a cartoonist and painter from Myanmar.

His Lawka Hma Bya and Myanma Yoya Hatha comics are particularly successful.

Biography and career 

He was born on 26 May 1948 in Yangon. He graduated from the Royal Government of the Arts (SSFH) in 1969.

He studied cartoon and painting art at the painting and sculpture school, Yangon and Cartoonist Aung Shein. Since 1969, he has been drawing cartoons under the penname Ngwe Kyi and is a well-known cartoonist in Myanmar.

Painting career
During the year 1969 to 2007, he was involved in a series of local group exhibitions. In August 2007, his first solo exhibition was exhibited at the New Treasure Art Gallery.

References

Living people
Burmese painters
Burmese performance artists
1948 births